The 1930 Providence Steam Roller season was their sixth in the league. The team improved on their previous season's output of 4–6–2, winning six games. They finished fifth in the league.

Schedule

Standings

References

Providence Steam Roller seasons
Providence Steam Roller